La Familia de al Lado (International title: The Family Next Door) is a Chilean telenovela created by José Ignacio Valenzuela. It was produced by the Chilean national channel Televisión Nacional de Chile and aired by the same channel from September 2010 through March 2011. It stars Álvaro Rudolphy, María Elena Swett, Jorge Zabaleta, Luz Valdivieso, and Cristián Arriagada. La Casa de al Lado (English – The House Next Door) is a remake of the original telenovela produced by the American Spanish-language network Telemundo.

The series revolves around two families that live next door to each other: the Fabres family and the Ruiz-Tagle family. Renato Fabres (Jaime Vadell) is a wealthy businessman, who lives a picturesque life with his family: his wife Eva Spencer (Coca Guazzini) and their three children Ignacia (Luz Valdivieso), Carola (Francisca Lewin), and Benjamín (Pablo Díaz). Meanwhile, their next door neighbors Javier Ruiz-Tagle (Jorge Zabaleta) and Pilar Echeñique (María Elena Swett), seem to also live a picturesque life with their children, Andrea (Constanza Piccoli) and Diego (Giovanni Carella). The arrival of Ignacia's new husband, Gonzalo Ibáñez (Álvaro Rudolphy), and the immediate attraction that flares between him and Pilar shakes everything up. Leonardo (Cristián Arriagada), the quadriplegic identical twin brother of Carola's late husband Hugo (also Cristián Arriagada), holds many secrets, including whether or not Hugo actually committed suicide. All the secrets the two families have will be revealed and everyone's lives will be forever altered.

Plot
The series opens with the oldest Fabres daughter, Ignacia, marrying Gonzalo Ibáñez. Ignacia's first husband Hugo committed suicide a year earlier. Hugo's identical twin brother, Leonardo, is a quadriplegic and lives in the Fabres home. Through hints dropped by Leonardo, it appears that Hugo did not commit suicide and was actually murdered by Ignacia. Gonzalo finds himself unsettled by this revelation as well as the presence of Ignacia's unstable sister, Carola, her voyeuristic brother, Benjamin and strange occurrences in the house of Fabres.

Next door, Pilar Echeñique is in an unhappy marriage to her controlling husband, Javier Ruiz-Tagle. Pilar and Gonzalo form a bond and become attracted to each other. When Ignacia tells Gonzalo she is pregnant, he knows he is not the father, because he is infertile. It is revealed that Ignacia has been having an affair with Javier and he is the father. Ignacia later miscarries. Pilar and Gonzalo begin a passionate affair.

Another shocking revelation comes to light when it is shown that Hugo really did not commit suicide— he is still alive and is posing as Leonardo! Also, Hugo has not been working alone, his accomplice is none other than Gonzalo, who is actually his older brother. The three brothers' real names are Ismael (Hugo), Iván (Leonardo), and Iñigo (Gonzalo) Mora. When the three men were children, their mother had an affair with Renato and then their father, who worked at Renato's company, went to prison for financial crimes that were actually committed by Renato. Afterwards, the boys' mother abandoned them and they were brought up by their housekeeper. Gonzalo and Hugo decided to exact on revenge on the Fabres family for ruining their family. They decided to worm their way into the family, first by Hugo marrying Ignacia and then staging his own suicide by murdering Leonardo and taking his place, and then by Gonzalo also marrying Ignacia. Hugo has also been responsible for all strange occurrences in the Fabres home with his aim to drive Ignacia crazy.

Cast

Main cast

Secondary cast

Soundtrack 

Chilean telenovelas
2010 telenovelas
2010 Chilean television series debuts
2011 Chilean television series endings
Televisión Nacional de Chile telenovelas
Spanish-language telenovelas